Liam Scott McArthur (born 8 August 1967) is a Scottish politician serving as Deputy Presiding Officer of the Scottish Parliament, alongside Annabelle Ewing, since May 2021. A member of the Scottish Liberal Democrats, he has been the Member of the Scottish Parliament (MSP) for Orkney since 2007.

Early life and education
McArthur was born on 8 August 1967 in Edinburgh. In 1977, at the age of ten, he moved to Sanday, Orkney with his family.

McArthur attended Sanday Junior High School, then Kirkwall Grammar school, where he boarded at the Papdale Halls of Residence throughout the week. Whilst at Kirkwall, McArthur developed an interest in sport including football, which became a lifelong passion. McArthur went on to represent Orkney in the junior inter country matches against Caithness and Shetland.

McArthur then spent a year in Mexico as an American field service student, before attending Edinburgh University to study politics. At university McArthur captained Edinburgh University football first team and represented Scottish Universities in the UK finals.

Political career
McArthur had previously worked as an aide to Jim Wallace in the House of Commons and as Special Adviser to the Deputy First Minister in 2002. When Wallace stepped down at the 2007 Parliament election, McArthur was chosen to replace him as the Lib Dem candidate and was elected. McArthur was subsequently re-elected in 2011 and again in 2016 with a substantially increased majority.

After being re-elected in the 2021 election, McArthur was elected as one of the two Deputy Presiding Officers of the Scottish Parliament.

Career timeline
 1987–1990: University of Edinburgh, Politics (MA)
 1990–1992: Researcher, Jim Wallace MP (Orkney and Shetland), House of Commons
 1992–1993: Trainee, European Commission (External Affairs Directorate)
 1993–1996: Account Executive, various European Union public affairs consultancies
 1996–2002: Associate Director, APCO Worldwide and APCO Europe
 2002–2005: Special Adviser to Deputy First Minister of Scotland, Jim Wallace MSP (Orkney)
 2005–2006: Director, Greenhaus Communications
 2006–2007: Self-employed political consultant
 2007–present: Member of the Scottish Parliament for Orkney
 2007–2008: Shadow Minister for Enterprise, Energy and Tourism
 2008–2011: Scottish Liberal Democrat Spokesperson on Environment, Rural Development and Energy
 2011–2021: Scottish Liberal Democrat Spokesperson on Education and Energy
 2021–present: Deputy Presiding Officer of the Scottish Parliament

References

External links 
 
 
 Scottish Liberal Democrats page
 BBC profile

1967 births
Living people
People from Orkney
Alumni of the University of Edinburgh
Members of the Scottish Parliament 2007–2011
Liberal Democrat MSPs
Members of the Scottish Parliament 2011–2016
Members of the Scottish Parliament 2016–2021
Members of the Scottish Parliament 2021–2026
Deputy Presiding Officers of the Scottish Parliament